Herald, of Jersey, Thomas Peckslock, master, acquired a letter of marque on 15 January 1798

On 24 February as Herald was entering the Bay of Naples, three French privateers attacked her; in a three-hour action she repelled the attack, inflicting heavy casualties on her largest attacker. The three consisted of a cutter armed with five 18-pounder guns, a row galley with two 18-pounder guns, and a launch with one 18-pounder gun. Reportedly, the cutter suffered 14 men killed before she pulled back. The three privateers renewed their attack but Herald repelled them again. The next day a launch attacked; when she was within 50 yards Herald fired a broadside, sinking the launch. There were no survivors. Herald then came into Naples.

On 21 August Lloyd's List (LL) reported that as Herald. Pickstock, master, was sailing from St Ubes to Labrador, she captured a Spanish packet ship of 10 guns and 19 men. The Spanish ship was on her way from Havana to Cadiz, and Herald sent her into Weymouth.

Fate: In January 1799 LL reported that as Herald, Pickstock, master, was sailing from Gallipoli, Apulia, to London, five Spanish frigates captured her and sent her into Cartagena, Spain.

Citations

1790s ships
Age of Sail merchant ships of England
Captured ships